Abdil is another English form for the  Arabic word "Abd-Al", "Abd-El", "Abd-ul" which means Servant of. 

Abdil is also similar to "Abdeel" ("Servant of God"), which is also cognate to the popular Arabic and Muslim name "Abdullah", which means the "Servant of Allah". There are other Muslim names forms like Abdil or Abdi ( which literally means "My Servant" in Arabic). The form of Obadiah's name used in the Septuagint is Obdios; in Latin it is Abdias. The Bishops' Bible has it as Abdi.

Given name
Abdil Qaiyyim Mutalib (born 14 May 1989), a Singaporean professional footballer.
Abdil Ceylan (born 1983), Turkish long-distance and marathon runner.

Arabic-language surnames
Arabic masculine given names